Augustinussen is a surname. Notable people with the surname include:

Johan Augustinussen (1808–1888), Norwegian curate/choirmaster, teacher, and politician
Thomas Augustinussen (born 1981), Danish footballer and coach